Savannah "Sav" Fitzpatrick (born 4 February 1995) is an Australian field hockey player.

Fitzpatrick was born in Cabarita Beach, New South Wales, and made her senior international debut in a test series against China in April 2015.

Fitzpatrick was part of the Australian women's junior national team 'The Jillaroos' that won bronze at the 2016 Hockey Junior World Cup in Chile.

Fitzpatrick qualified for the Tokyo 2020 Olympics. She was part of the Hockeyroos Olympics squad. The Hockeyroos lost 1–0 to India in the quarterfinals and therefore were not in medal contention.

Personal life
Savannah Fitzpatrick comes from a hockey family, with each member of her family having played at a representative level. Her father Scott and sister Maddy both having represented Australia, while her mother, Margie and siblings Callum and Kendra all having represented at state levels.

At the 2016 Hockey Junior World Cup, Madison and Savannah played together in the Jillaroos team that won bronze.

Career

International Goals

References

External links
 
 
 
 

1995 births
Living people
Australian female field hockey players
Commonwealth Games medallists in field hockey
Commonwealth Games silver medallists for Australia
Field hockey players at the 2018 Commonwealth Games
Field hockey players at the 2020 Summer Olympics
Olympic field hockey players of Australia
Sportswomen from New South Wales
Sportspeople from Sydney
21st-century Australian women
Medallists at the 2018 Commonwealth Games